Kybos is a genus of true bugs belonging to the family Cicadellidae.

The species of this genus are found in Europe, New Zealand and Northern America.

Species:
 Kybos abnormis (Datta & Ghosh, 1973) 
 Kybos abstrusus (Linnavuori, 1949)

References

Cicadellidae
Hemiptera genera